Haengju Gi clan is one of the Korean clans. Their Bon-gwan is in Goyang, Gyeonggi Province. According to the research held in 2015, the number of Haengju Gi clan was 27379. Their founder was  who was one of the Jun of Gojoseon’s three descendants(U-seong was the son of hun who was the 7th descendant of Jun). Jun of Gojoseon was the Gija Joseon’s last emperor.  is Gija’s 48 th grandchildren.

See also 
 Korean clan names of foreign origin

References

External links 
 

 
Gija Joseon
Korean clan names of Chinese origin